Ronald Caress (third ¼ 1920 – death unknown) was an English professional rugby league footballer who played in the 1940s.

Background
Ronald Caress' birth was registered in Wakefield, West Riding of Yorkshire, England.

Playing career

Club career
Ronald Caress made his début for Wakefield Trinity during October 1940, he played his last match for Wakefield Trinity during November 1944, he transferred as a World War II guest from Wakefield Trinity to Castleford, he made his début for Castleford on Saturday 11 November 1944, and he played his last match for Castleford on Saturday 11 November 1944.

References

External links
Search for "Caress" at rugbyleagueproject.org
Ronald Caress Memory Box Search at archive.castigersheritage.com
Search for "Ronald Caress" at britishnewspaperarchive.co.uk
Search for "Ronnie Caress" at britishnewspaperarchive.co.uk

1920 births
Castleford Tigers players
English rugby league players
Place of death missing
Rugby league centres
Rugby league wingers
Rugby league players from Wakefield
Wakefield Trinity players
Year of death missing